Umm al-Faraj (known to the Crusaders as La Fierge), was a Palestinian village, depopulated in 1948.

Location

History
Archaeological  remains from the Roman and Byzantine eras have been found here.

Sugar Moulds found here indicate that sugar productions started in the 11th century, under the  Fatimid era.

Crusader/Mamluk era
The village was known to the Crusaders as Le Fierge, and belonged to the fief of Casal Imbert.  In 1253 King Henry granted the whole estate of Casal Imbert, including  Le Fierge, to John of Ibelin. Shortly after, in 1256, John of Ibelin leased Az-Zeeb and all its depending villages (including  Le Fierge) to the Teutonic Order for 10 years. In 1261, Az-Zeeb, together with Le Fierge and Le Quiebre,  were sold to the Teutonic Order, in return for an annual sum for as long as Acre was in Christian hands. In 1283 it was still a part of the Crusader states, as it was mentioned as part of their domain in the hudna between the Crusaders based in Acre and the Mamluk sultan  Qalawun.

According to al-Maqrizi, it had come under Mamluk rule in 1291, when it was mentioned under the name of  Farah  when  sultan al-Ashraf Khalil allocated the village's income to a Waqf in Cairo.

Sugar production continued here during the Crusader and Mamluk eras.

Ottoman era
Incorporated into the Ottoman Empire in 1517 with all of Palestine, it appeared in the 1596 tax registers as Farja, being in the Akka Nahiya (Subdistrict of Acre), part of the Safad Sanjak (District of Safed), with a population of 24 households and 13 bachelors, all Muslim. The villagers paid a fixed tax rate of 20% on agricultural products,  including wheat, barley, summer crops, cotton, goats and beehives,  in addition to "occasional revenues" and a water mill; a total of  1,576 akçe. Half of the revenues were given to a waqf.  Sugar production continued here to the beginning of the seventeenth century CE.

In 1799, the village was called El Fargi on the map of Pierre Jacotin. An inscription in marble, built into the wall above the gate of the village mosque, dates this building to 1254 H, (1838-39 C.E.).

In May 1875, the French explorer Victor Guérin visited the village. He described it as  being surrounded by "delightful" gardens, irrigated  with water from Nahr al-Mafshukh. Many houses were built with great care, and some had old pieces of stone built into them. He further noted that "the location of an old demolished church is still to a certain extent recognisable", and that all the 200 villagers were Muslim. In 1881, the PEF's Survey of Western Palestine described it as being built of stone and with a population of 200. The villagers planted fig, olive, mulberry and pomegranate trees.

A population list from about 1887 showed  Um el Ferj to have  about 690 inhabitants, all Muslims.

British Mandate era
In the 1922 census of Palestine conducted by the British Mandate authorities Umm al Faraj  had a population of 322, all Muslims,  increasing in the 1931 census to 415, 2 Christians and 413 Muslims,  in  a total of 94 houses.
The older houses in the village were built close together and formed a circle, while the homes build after 1936 were scattered among the orchards. The population of  Umm al-Faraj lived by agriculture.

In the 1945 statistics, the population of Umm al-Faraj  was 800, all Muslims, with a total land area of  825 dunams.

1948 War and aftermath

During the 1948 Arab-Israeli War, Umm al-Faraj was assaulted by Israel's Carmeli Brigade in the second stage of Operation Ben'Ami. The operational order, issued 19 May 1948, was to "attack with the aim of conquest, the killing of adult males, destruction and torching." The assault came on the 20–21 May 1948, when Carmeli forces attacked Umm al-Faraj together with Kabri, al Tell and Nahar, and then "demolished them," according to Morris.

Following the war the area was incorporated into the State of Israel. The moshav of Ben Ami was established in 1949, in part on village land.

The Palestinian historian Walid Khalidi described the  village remains in 1992:  "Only the stone mosque remains. It is shut and stands in a state of decay amid tall wild grass. Many trees that might predate the village's destruction can be seen. The nearby lands are cultivated; a banana grove belongs to the Ben Ammi settlement."

See also
Depopulated Palestinian locations in Israel

References

Bibliography

 
 

(p. 636)
 
 (For future expansion: Chapter 2: Mrs Zamzam in the Rashidieh refugee camp in southern Lebanon recalls Umm al-Faraj)

External links
Welcome to Umm-al-Faraj
Umm al-Faraj, Zochrot
Survey of Western Palestine, Map 3:  IAA, Wikimedia commons 
Um Al-Faraj photos, from Dr. Moslih Kanaaneh
Umm Al-Faraj, at Khalil Sakakini Cultural Center

District of Acre
Arab villages depopulated during the 1948 Arab–Israeli War
Teutonic Order